The 55th season of the Campeonato Gaúcho kicked off on February 16, 1975, and ended on August 10, 1975. Thirty-two teams participated. Internacional won their 23rd title.

Participating teams

System 
The championship would have four stages.:

 Preliminary phase: The ten clubs that had participated in the Final decagonal of last year's championship (minus Grêmio and Internacional) would join the sixteen teams qualified in the Copa Governador do Estado of the previous year and another six teams qualified from the Copa Cícero Soares. the resulting thirty teams would be divided into six groups of five teams. Each team would play against the teams of their own group twice and the three best teams of each group would qualify to the First stage.
 First phase: The remaining eighteen teams, now joined by Grêmio and Internacional, would play each other once. The four best teams would qualify to the Second round. The winner would also qualify for the Final phase.
 Second phase: The remaining four teams would play each other twice. the best team in each round qualified to the Final phase.
 Finals: The winners of the first stage and the two rounds of the second stage qualified to this stage. Each participant would have one point allotted to them by stage won, and the teams would play each other until one reached four points, with that team winning the title. If the same team won all three stages, it would win the title automatically.

Championship

Preliminary phase

Group 1

Group 2

Group 3

Group 4

Group 5

Group 6

First phase

Second phase

First round

Playoffs

Second round

Playoffs

Copa Governador do Estado

System 
The cup would have seven stages: 

 First phase: Sixteen teams would be divided into four groups of four teams. Each team would play twice against the teams of its own group. All teams qualified to the Second phase.
 Second phase: The sixteen teams joined the twelve teams that had been eliminated in the Preliminary phase of the Campeonato Gaúcho and were divided into four groups of seven teams. Once again, all teams qualified to the Third phase.
 Third phase: The twenty-eight teams joined the sixteen teams that had been eliminated in the First phase of the Campeonato Gaúcho and another ten teams. the resulting fifty-four were divided into ten groups of five or six teams. The three best teams of each group would qualify to the 1976 Campeonato Gaúcho. The best teams of each group qualified to the Fourth phase.
 Fourth phase: The remaining ten teams would play each other in a double-legged knockout tie. One of the winners would be sorted to qualify directly to the Semifinals.
 Fifth phase: The remaining four teams would play each other in a double-legged knockout tie. One of the winners would be sorted to qualify directly to the Finals.
 Semifinals: The winners of the fifth phase would play the team that had received a bye to the semifinals in a double-legged knockout tie. The winner qualified to the Finals.
 Finals: The winners of the Semifinals would play the team that had received a bye to the Finals in a double-legged knockout tie for the title.

Third phase

Group A

Group B

Group C

Group D

Group E

Group F

Group G

Group H

Group I

Group J

Fourth phase 

|}

Fifth phase 

|}

Semifinals 

|}

Finals 

|}

References 

Campeonato Gaúcho seasons
Gaúcho